Ivănești is a commune in Vaslui County, Western Moldavia, Romania. It is composed of fourteen villages: Albina, Bleșca, Broșteni, Buscata, Coșca, Coșești, Fundătura Mare, Fundătura Mică, Hârșoveni, Iezerel, Ivănești, Ursoaia, Valea Mare and Valea Oanei.

Natives
 Petrică Cărare

References

Communes in Vaslui County
Localities in Western Moldavia